Night & Day: Big Band is the eighteenth studio album by the American band Chicago, and twenty-second overall, released in 1995. It is a departure from Top 40 material for a more thematic project, with a focus on classic big band, jazz, and swing music.

Chicago left Reprise Records and started their own imprint, Chicago Records, to distribute their music. This album was carried by Giant Records, a subsidiary of Warner Music, who also distributes Reprise.

With producer Bruce Fairbairn, Chicago recorded Night & Day: Big Band from late 1994 to early 1995 and released it that May.  Although Bruce Gaitsch joined the band and played guitar on the album sessions, the guitar slot would be filled by Keith Howland later that year. Joe Perry of Aerosmith was brought in to add a solo to "Blues in the Night".

The album reached #90 in the US, on the Billboard 200 chart.

Background
Chicago made its "television variety debut" in February 1973 on a television special honoring Duke Ellington, Duke Ellington... We Love You Madly, which aired on CBS. The band performed the Ellington composition, "Jump for Joy." They were the only rock musicians invited to appear on the show. Walter Parazaider cited the group's participation in the television special, and Duke Ellington's comments to them afterwards, as important factors in their decision to record this album.

Track listing

Personnel 
Adapted from AllMusic.

Chicago 
 Bill Champlin – keyboards, guitar, vocals, vocal arrangements, arrangements (4, 7, 10, 11)
 Bruce Gaitsch – guitar, arrangements (10)
 Tris Imboden – drums, harmonica, arrangements (10)
 Robert Lamm – keyboards, vocals, additional vocal arrangements, arrangements (1, 6, 9-12)
 Lee Loughnane – trumpet, flugelhorn, brass arrangements (7, 8, 10), arrangements (8), vocal arrangements (8)
 James Pankow – trombone, brass arrangements (1-6, 9-12), arrangements (2, 3, 5, 10)
 Walter Parazaider – woodwinds, arrangements (10)
 Jason Scheff – bass, vocals, additional vocal arrangements, arrangements (9, 10)

Additional personnel 
 Luis Conte – percussion
 Jack Duncan – percussion on "Night and Day"
 Sal Ferreras – percussion on "Night and Day"
 The Gipsy Kings (Nicolas Reyes and Patchai Reyes) – vocals, rumba flamenco guitars and vocal arrangements on "Sing, Sing, Sing"
 Jade – vocals on "Dream a Little Dream of Me"
 Joe Perry – guitar solo on "Blues in the Night"
 Paul Shaffer – acoustic piano stylings on "Dream a Little Dream of Me"
 Bruce Fairbairn – trumpet solo on "Chicago"
 Tonino Baliardo – lead guitar on "Sing, Sing, Sing"
 Peter Wolf – arrangements on "In the Mood"
 Shelly Berg – orchestrations, big band arrangements
 Bill Watrous – big band arrangements

Production 
 Bruce Fairbairn – producer
 The Gipsy Kings – co-producer (on "Sing, Sing, Sing")
 Gerard Prevost – co-producer
 John Kalodner – A&R
 Erwin Musper – engineer, mixing
 Delwyn Brooks – assistant engineer
 Mike Plotnikoff – second engineer
 Robbes Stieglitz – assistant engineer
 Recorded at Armoury Studios (Vancouver, B.C. ) and Record Plant (Los Angeles, CA).
 Bernie Grundman – mastering at Bernie Grundman Mastering (Hollywood, CA).
 Larry Vigon – art direction, design
 Brian Jackson – design
 Hugh Kretschmer – cover photography
 Guy Webster – inside photography

Chart performance

References

Chicago (band) albums
1995 albums
Albums produced by Bruce Fairbairn
Giant Records (Warner) albums
Big band albums